Am I Blue may refer to:

"Am I Blue?", a 1929 song written by Harry Akst and Grant Clarke
Am I Blue (album), a 1963 album by jazz guitarist Grant Green
"Am I Blue" (George Strait song), a 1987 song written by David Chamberlain
Am I Blue (play), a play written by Beth Henley